Jason Ulmer (born December 20, 1978) is a Canadian former professional ice hockey player. He ast played for EHC Black Wings Linz of the Austrian Hockey League (EBEL). He previously played with EHC München in the Deutsche Eishockey Liga (DEL). On June 20, 2013, out of contract with München after the 2012–13 season, Ulmer signed a one-year contract with EHC Black Wings Linz of the Neighbouring Austrian Hockey League. At the conclusion of the 2015-16 season, his third campaign with the Black Wings, Ulmer announced his retirement from professional hockey on April 2, 2016.

Career statistics

Awards and honors

References

External links

1978 births
Living people
EHC Black Wings Linz players
Canadian ice hockey centres
Hannover Scorpions players
Hershey Bears players
Kassel Huskies players
Lukko players
Milwaukee Admirals (IHL) players
EHC München players
North Dakota Fighting Hawks men's ice hockey players
Notre Dame Hounds players
Portland Pirates players
Quad City Mallards (UHL) players
Grizzlys Wolfsburg players
Canadian expatriate ice hockey players in Austria
Canadian expatriate ice hockey players in Finland
Canadian expatriate ice hockey players in Germany
NCAA men's ice hockey national champions
Canadian expatriate ice hockey players in the United States